Elliptio dariensis is a species of freshwater mussel, an aquatic bivalve mollusk in the family Unionidae, the river mussels.

This species is endemic to the United States.

References

Molluscs of the United States
dariensis
Bivalves described in 1842
Taxonomy articles created by Polbot